Nameless Sylvan Reserve is a  nature reserve on the Illawarra Escapment of south-eastern New South Wales, Australia. It is owned and managed by Bush Heritage Australia (BHA), to which it was donated in 2007 by Louise Sylvan.

Landscape and biota
The property is steeply sloped, with Irwin's Creek flowing through the reserve; the lower part protects a scarce remnant of Illawarra subtropical rainforest, while the higher part holds temperate rainforest.  Plant species include the Giant Stinging Tree, Red Cedar and Brush Bloodwood, as well as various kinds of figs.  The principal management needs are the control of weeds and feral animals.

From the animal world, Freshwater Crayfish, Platypus and Swamp Wallabies can be found here.

References

External links
 Bush Heritage Australia

Bush Heritage Australia reserves
Nature reserves in New South Wales
2007 establishments in Australia